Diphenylbutylpiperidines are a class of typical antipsychotic drugs which were all synthesized, developed, and marketed by Janssen Pharmaceutica.

They include:
 Clopimozide (R-29,764)
 Fluspirilene (Redeptin)
 Penfluridol (Semap, Micefal, Longoperidol)
 Pimozide (Orap)

References 

 
Chemical classes of psychoactive drugs